Patriarch Peter of Alexandria may refer to:

 Patriarch Peter I of Alexandria, Greek Patriarch of Alexandria in 300–311
 Patriarch Peter II of Alexandria, Greek Patriarch of Alexandria in 373–380
 Patriarch Peter III of Alexandria, Greek Patriarch of Alexandria in 477 and 482–490
 Patriarch Peter IV of Alexandria, Greek Patriarch of Alexandria in 642–651
 Patriarch Peter V of Alexandria, Greek Patriarch of Alexandria between the 7th and 8th centuries
 Patriarch Peter VI of Alexandria, Greek Patriarch of Alexandria between the 7th and 8th centuries
 Patriarch Peter VII of Alexandria, Greek Patriarch of Alexandria and all Africa in 1997–2004